Tamar Meisels is a Professor of Government and Policy in the Department of Political Science at Tel Aviv University, and a political theorist.

Biography
Her father, Andrew Meisels, is a descendant of the Meisels family and was a foreign correspondent, author, and broadcaster. Her mother Martha Meisels, was a consumer affairs reporter for the Jerusalem Post.

She earned a B.A., L.L.B., and M.A. at Tel Aviv University, and a Ph.D in Political Theory at Balliol College, Oxford University, in 2000.  She works on the political theory of territorial rights, liberal nationalism, and the philosophical questions surrounding war and terrorism.<ref>"Do Israeli jails prepare prisoners for peace?", Josh Spiro, Jewish Post</ref>

Meisels is known for advocating a consistent and strict definition of terrorism, which she defines as "the intentional random murder of defenseless non-combatants, with the intent of instilling fear of mortal danger amidst a civilian population as a strategy designed to advance political ends."

She has written on the complexities of applying international law to terrorists, who are neither soldiers nor civilians.

Select works

Books

 Territorial Rights (2009)
 The Trouble with Terror: Liberty, Security and the Response to Terrorism (Cambridge University Press, 2008)
 "Historical Rights" to Land'' (1999)

Articles

References

Israeli political scientists
Israeli Jews
Israeli political philosophers
Year of birth missing (living people)
Living people
Alumni of Balliol College, Oxford
Academic staff of Tel Aviv University
Terrorism theorists
Israeli women academics
Women political scientists